Andrea Orlandini (born 6 February 1948) is an Italian footballer who played as a midfielder. He represented the Italy national football team three times, the first being on 20 November 1974, the occasion of a UEFA Euro 1976 qualifying match against the Netherlands in a 3–1 away loss.

Honours

Player
Napoli
Coppa Italia: 1975–76

References

1948 births
Italian footballers
Italy international footballers
Association football midfielders
Serie A players
Serie B players
ACF Fiorentina players
A.C. Reggiana 1919 players
A.S. Sambenedettese players
A.C. Prato players
S.S.C. Napoli players
Living people